Kittiewan, originally known as Millford, is a historic plantation house located near New Hope, Charles City County, Virginia. It was built in the 18th century, and is a typical Colonial-period medium-size wood-frame Virginia Tidewater plantation house.  It consists of a -story, main section with a gable roof, with an original gable roofed ell and later lean-to addition.

Its first known owner was Dr. William Rickman, the first Director of Hospitals of the Continental Army in Virginia during the American Revolution. Stewardship of the house and surrounding 720 acres (2.9 km2) is administered by the Archeological Society of Virginia. The house and grounds are open to the public by appointment.

It was added to the National Register of Historic Places in 1978.

References

External links
 Kittiewan Plantation - Managed by the Archeological Society of Virginia

Historic house museums in Virginia
Houses on the National Register of Historic Places in Virginia
James River plantations
Houses completed in 1750
Houses in Charles City County, Virginia
National Register of Historic Places in Charles City County, Virginia
Museums in Charles City County, Virginia
Plantation houses in Virginia